Dudi Sela was the defending champion, but he lost in the quarterfinals to Grega Žemlja.
Grega Žemlja won the title defeating Karol Beck in the final 7–6(7–3), 4–6, 6–4.

Seeds

Draw

Finals

Top half

Bottom half

References
 Main Draw
 Qualifying Draw

Nottingham Challenge - Singles
2012 Men's Singles